Dzieciuki is a Belarusian folk punk group from Hrodna. It was founded on April 10, 2012. The group has released two studio albums, Haradzenski harmidar and Recha. It positions itself as an educational folk punk brigade, which tells about unrevealed pages of Belarusian history. Several of the Dzieciuki members also take part in Liudzi na baloce group. In 2014 the musicians won the "Heroes of the year" award of Belarusian music portal Tuzin.fm.

From the very beginning of their concert activity, many of their performances in Belarus were prohibited by the authorities. Thus, their concerts in Brest and Minsk were prohibited. On April 1, 2017 the concert surprisingly was allowed and took place in Vicebsk.

Discography

Albums 
 Haradzenski harmidar (EP, 2012)
 Haradzenski harmidar (2014)
 Recha (2016)

Collections 
 Re:Pesniary (2014), "A chto tam idze" track
 Tribute To The Pogues (2016), "Ne saskoču!" track

Videos 
 Sumnaje regi (2014-2015)
 Laddzia rospačy (2015-2016)
 Liasnyja braty (2017)

Group members 
 Dzianis Žyhavec: lyrics
 Paša 'Trouble' Trublin: vocals, Belarusian duda
 Aleś Dzianisaŭ: acoustic guitar, banjo, vocals
 Andrej 'Piton' Piatko: bass guitar, vocals
 Mikola 'Kaliamba' Paliakou: accordion
 Lioša Pudzin: guitar
 Andrej Pudzin: guitar
 Sania 'Syr' Syraježka: drum kit

References

External links
 Dzieciuki on Last.fm
 Dzieciuki  on YouTube
 Dzieciuki on Facebook

Folk punk groups
Musical groups established in 2012
2012 establishments in Belarus
Belarusian musical groups